Artur Saifutdinov (born 11 January 1997) is a Russian Paralympic swimmer who represented Russian Paralympic Committee athletes at the 2020 Summer Paralympics.

Career
Isaev represented Russian Paralympic Committee athletes at the 2020 Summer Paralympics in the men's 100 metre breaststroke SB12 event and won a bronze medal.

References

1997 births
Living people
People from Sterlitamak
Medalists at the World Para Swimming European Championships
Paralympic swimmers of Russia
Swimmers at the 2020 Summer Paralympics
Medalists at the 2020 Summer Paralympics
Paralympic medalists in swimming
Paralympic bronze medalists for the Russian Paralympic Committee athletes
Russian male breaststroke swimmers
S12-classified Paralympic swimmers
Sportspeople from Bashkortostan
20th-century Russian people
21st-century Russian people